Horteflaket Névé is a névé at the head of Mushketov Glacier, between the Petermann Ranges and the Weyprecht Mountains in Queen Maud Land, Antarctica. First plotted from air photos by the Third German Antarctic Expedition, 1938–39, it was replotted from air photos and surveys by the Sixth Norwegian Antarctic Expedition, 1956–60, and named by them.

References

Snow fields of Antarctica
Bodies of ice of Queen Maud Land
Princess Astrid Coast
Névés of Antarctica